Canberra Cosmos Football Club was an Australian professional association football club based in Canberra. The club was formed and admitted into the National Soccer League in 1995. The club had never qualified for the Finals series in the National Soccer League in all six seasons of existence until they became defunct in September 2001.

The list encompasses the records set by the club, their managers and their players. The player records section itemises the club's leading goalscorers and those who have made most appearances in first-team competitions. It also records notable achievements by Canberra Cosmos players on the international stage. Attendance records in Canberra are also included.

The club's record appearance maker was Toplica Popovich, who made 126 appearances between 1995 and 2001. Peter Buljan was Canberra Cosmos' record goalscorer, scoring 21 goals in total.

Player records

Appearances
 Most league appearances: Toplica Popovich, 123
 Most NSL Cup appearances: John Koch, 5

Most appearances
Competitive matches only, includes appearances as substitute. Numbers in brackets indicate goals scored.

Goalscorers
 Most goals in a season: Ivo de Jesus, 12 goals (in the 1999–2000 season)
 Most league goals in a season: Ivo de Jesus, 12 goals in the National Soccer League, 1999–2000

Top goalscorers
Peter Buljan was the all-time top goalscorer for Canberra Cosmos.

Competitive matches only. Numbers in brackets indicate appearances made.

International
This section refers only to caps won while a Canberra Cosmos player.
 First capped player: Paul Wade, for Australia against New Zealand on 15 November 1995
 Most capped player: Paul Wade with 8 caps

Club records

Matches

Firsts
 First National Soccer League match: Adelaide City 2–0 Canberra Cosmos, National Soccer League, 8 October 1995
 First NSL Cup match: West Adelaide 1–1 Canberra Cosmos, First round, 3 January 1996

Record wins
 Record NSL win: 8–1 against Sydney Olympic, National Soccer League, 5 January 1998
 Record NSL Cup win: 1–0 against West Adelaide, First round, 20 January 1996

Record defeats
 Record NSL defeat: 0–8 against Wollongong Wolves, National Soccer League, 5 December 1997
 Record NSL Cup defeat: 1–3 against South Melbourne, Semi-finals, 25 January 1996

Record consecutive results
 Record consecutive wins: 3, from 22 April 2000 to 29 April 2000
 Record consecutive defeats: 16, from 30 March 1998 to 10 January 1999
 Record consecutive draws: 3, from 23 January 2000 to 28 January 2000
 Record consecutive NSL matches without a defeat: 4, from 22 April 2000 to 7 May 2000
 Record consecutive matches without a win: 23, from 22 February 1998 to 24 January 1999

Goals
 Most NSL goals scored in a season: 49 in 30 matches, National Soccer League, 2000–01
 Fewest NSL goals scored in a season: 21 in 28 matches, National Soccer League, 1998–99
 Most NSL goals conceded in a season: 69 in 26 matches, National Soccer League, 1996–97
 Fewest NSL goals conceded in a season:
 55 in 28 matches, National Soccer League, 1998–99
 55 in 30 matches, National Soccer League, 2000–01

Points
 Most points in a season: 37 in 30 matches, National Soccer League, 2000–01
 Fewest points in a season: 11 in 26 matches, National Soccer League, 1996–97

Attendances
 Highest attendance at Canberra: 9,421, against Newcastle Breakers, National Soccer League, 1 November 1996
 Lowest attendance at Canberra:
 1,000 against Brisbane Strikers, National Soccer League, 14 December 1996
 1,000 against Adelaide City, National Soccer League, 29 March 1997

References

Canberra Cosmos